Calculating device may stand for:

 Calculator, a portable electronic device used to perform calculations
 Slide rule, a graphical analog calculator, related to the nomogram